The 2019 Vuelta a San Juan was a road cycling stage race that took place in the San Juan Province of Argentina between 27 January and 3 February 2019. The race was rated as a 2.1 event as part of the 2019 UCI America Tour, and was the 37th edition of the Vuelta a San Juan.

Teams
Twenty-seven teams started the race. Each team had a maximum of seven riders:

Route

Stages

Stage 1

Stage 2

Stage 3

Stage 4

Stage 5

Stage 6

Stage 7

Classifications

Classification leadership table

References

2019
2019 UCI America Tour
2019 in Argentine sport